Let the Ocean Take Me is the fourth studio album by Australian metalcore band the Amity Affliction. It was released on 6 June 2014 in Australia, 9 June 2014 in the UK and 10 June 2014 in the US through Roadrunner Records. It is their first record to feature new guitarist Dan Brown following Imran Siddiqi's departure shortly before their previous album release (August 2012). This is also the last album with founding lead guitarist, Troy Brady.

Music videos for "The Weigh Down" and "Death's Hand" were produced to promote the album, but were not released as singles.  On 10 June 2015, Amity released their first DVD documentary-film Seems Like Forever, containing two previously unreleased songs from Let The Ocean Take Me including "Skeletons", which was later released as a music video.

On June 6–8 off the Australian album release, Amity conducted in-store album signings in Brisbane, Sydney and Melbourne in support. The band shortly announced a five-date Australian tour, fifteen-date American tour and a twenty-three date European leg. The Big Ass Tour with A Day to Remember co-headlining was held in Australia and New Zealand in December 2015.

Critical reception

The album was given a Metacritic score of 76 out of 100, indicating "generally favourable reviews". Kerrang! called it the band's "most accomplished release yet", and AllMusic noted the "lyrical depth" of the album. Alternative Press received the sound evolution positively.

The album debuted at number 1 on the ARIA Charts, being their second consecutive album to do so, following 2012's Chasing Ghosts. Let the Ocean Take Me was certified gold by the Australian Recording Industry Association for over 35,000 shipments sold just two weeks after its release in Australia. It was certified platinum in December 2015.

In the United States, the album sold 10,000 copies in its first week, charting at number 31 on the Billboard 200.  It has sold 60,000 copies in the US as of June 2016.

Both the singles preceding the album, "Pittsburgh" and "Don't Lean On Me" peaked inside the top 40 of the ARIA Singles Chart.

Following the success of the album, The Amity Affliction was nominated for the "Breakthrough Band of the Year" award at the 2015 Metal Hammer Golden Gods Awards, alongside Halestorm, Bury Tomorrow and In This Moment, but lost out to BABYMETAL.

Track listing

Note

Personnel

The Amity Affliction
 Joel Birch – unclean vocals, art direction
 Ahren Stringer – clean vocals, bass, art direction
 Troy Brady – lead guitar
 Dan Brown – rhythm guitar
 Ryan Burt – drums, percussion

Additional musicians
 Matt Rogers (credited as RealBadDTD) – spoken interlude

Production
 Will Putney – production, engineering, mixing, mastering
 Jay Sakong – additional programming
 Andy Gomoll – additional editing

Management
 Jaddan Comerford and Caleb Williams (Unified) – worldwide management
 Dave Shapiro (The Agency Group) – U.S./Asia booking
 Adam Sylvester (The Agency Group) – Canada booking
 Marco Walzel (Avocado Booking) – UK/Europe booking
 Unified – Australia booking
 Andy Serrao (Roadrunner Records) – worldwide A&R

Artwork
 Pat Fox (Apollo Collective) – design, layout, art direction
 James Hartley – photography

Charts

Weekly charts

Year-end charts

Certifications

References 

2014 albums
The Amity Affliction albums
Roadrunner Records albums
UNFD albums
Albums produced by Will Putney